Axel Ranisch (born 30 June 1983 in Berlin) is a German actor, film and television director and author.

Life 
Ranisch lived in his childhood in Berlin-Lichtenberg. He studied until 2004 theatre pedagogy in Flecken Zechlin. From 2004 to 2011 Ranisch studied at Konrad Wolf Film University of Babelsberg. Ranisch works as film and theatre director and as actor in different film, theatre and tv-productions in Germany. Ranisch shot the film Pink Children (2012) together with 4 German directors about their mentor Rosa von Praunheim.  In 2018, he published as author the book Nackt über Berlin. In 2016, he married his partner Paul in Berlin.

Filmography

Director

Short films 
 2004: Rhythmus im Kopf 
 2005: Hollbüllhuus 
 2008: Liebe Liebe… 
 2010: Diego Alonso

Cinema & television
 2008: Der will nur spielen!
 2008: Glioblastom 
 2011: Dicke Mädchen 
 2012: Pink Children 
 2013: Ich fühl mich Disco 
 2013: Reuber 
 2015: Alki Alki 
 2015: Löwenzahn 
 2016: Familie Lotzmann auf den Barrikaden 
 2016: Tatort: Babbeldasch (Lena Odenthal-Tatort; SWR) 
 2017: Tatort: Waldlust (Lena Odenthal Tatort; SWR) 
 2018: Löwenzahn

Actor

Television 
 2007: Sechs tote Studenten (director: Rosa von Praunheim)
 2009: Résiste – Aufstand der Praktikanten (director: Jonas Grosch)
 2009: Meine Daten und ich (director: Philipp Eichholtz)
 2011: Papa Gold (auch Schnitt) (director: Tom Lass)
 2011: Wie man leben soll (director: David Schalko)
 2012:  (director: Isabel Kleefeld)
 2013: Axel und Peter – Titten für Arsch (director: Rosa von Praunheim)
 2014: Zorn – Tod und Regen (1. Teil der Serie Zorn, director: Mark Schlichter)
 2014: Liebe mich! (director: Philipp Eichholtz)
 2015: Zorn – Vom Lieben und Sterben (director: Mark Schlichter)
 2015: Zorn – Wo kein Licht (director Christoph Schnee)
 2016: Zorn – Wie sie töten (director: Jochen Alexander Freydank)
 2017: Zorn – Kalter Rauch (director: Andreas Herzog)
 2017: Blind & Hässlich (director: Tom Lass)
 2019: Familie Lotzmann auf den Barrikaden

Theatre 
 2009: A Clockwork Orange by Anthony Burgess at Brandenburger Jugendtheater, Co-Regie, together with Christiane Ziehl
 2013: The Bear by  William Walton & La voix humaine from Francis Poulenc at Bayerischen Staatsoper (Spielstätte: Kino Theatiner Film)
 2014: George (UA) Komische Oper in three acts, with a prolog and an epilog. music from Elena Kats-Chernin, libretto from Axel Ranisch, a production from Danya Segal and Theater für Niedersachsen in cooperation with Niedersächsische Musiktage and KunstFestSpiele Herrenhausen
 2015: Pinocchio by Pierangelo Valtinoni at Bayerische Staatsoper (Reithalle)
 2018: Konrad oder Das Kind aus der Konservenbüchse by Christine Nöstlinger at Theater an der Parkaue
 2018: Orlando paladino from Joseph Haydn at Bayerischen Staatsoper (Prinzregententheater)
 2018: Die Liebe zu drei Orangen from Sergei Prokofjew at Staatsoper Stuttgart 
 2019: Mavra from  Igor Strawinsky & Jolanthe by Pjotr Iljitsch Tschaikowski at Bayerische Staatsoper (Cuvilliés-Theater)

Writer
 Nackt über Berlin, Ullstein fünf Verlag, Berlin 2018. 384 pages

References

External links 

 Official website by Axel Ranisch
 Axel Ranisch by agentur
 Interview in SWR2
 Mitteldeutsche Zeitung.de: Zwischen den „Zorn“-Drehs auf Geheim-Mission Hochzeit 
 Deutschlandfunk.de: Axel Ranisch gewinnt den Debütpreis der Lit.Cologne

1983 births
Living people
German male film actors
German male television actors
German male stage actors
German-language film directors
German male writers
German gay actors
21st-century German male actors
German male actors
Film directors from Berlin
LGBT film directors
LGBT television directors
People from East Berlin
People from Lichtenberg
21st-century LGBT people